The Waterhen River (French : Rivière de la Poule d'Eau) is a river of Manitoba, Canada. It is the primary outflow for Lake Winnipegosis and flows into Lake Manitoba.

From Long Island Bay at the southeast end of the Lake Winnipegosis the West Waterhen and Little Waterhen rivers flow north about  into Waterhen Lake then the Waterhen River flows south  into Lake Manitoba.

Gallery

See also

List of rivers of Manitoba

References 

Rivers of Manitoba
Hudson's Bay Company trading posts